The 1963 Bulgarian Cup Final was the 23rd final of the Bulgarian Cup (in this period the tournament was named Cup of the Soviet Army) that took place on 10 September 1963 at Vasil Levski National Stadium in Sofia. It was contested between Slavia Sofia and Botev Plovdiv, with two goals from Mihail Mishev giving Slavia a 2–0 win to claim their 2nd Bulgarian Cup title.

Route to the Final

Match

Details

See also
1962–63 A Group

References

Bulgarian Cup finals
Botev Plovdiv matches
PFC Slavia Sofia matches
Cup Final